James Mockler  was Archdeacon of Cloyne from 1779 until his death in 1789. 

Mockler was born in Ballyclogh, County Cork and educated at Trinity College, Dublin  He was ordained in 1756. After  curacies in Bruhenny and Cloyne he held incumbencies at Subulter, Aghinagh House, Nathlash, Mallow and Kilmahon. He was Vicar choral of Cloyne Cathedral from 1772 to 1773.

References

People from County Cork
Alumni of Trinity College Dublin
Archdeacons of Cloyne
1789 deaths